Daniel A. Woods (1840s - August 10, 1894) was an American soldier and recipient of the Medal of Honor.

Biography 
Woods was born in the 1840s in Ohio County, West Virginia although sources dispute the exact birth year. He served as a private in the 1st West Virginia Cavalry. He earned his medal on April 6, 1865 at the Battle of Sayler's Creek, Virginia. He died on August 10, 1894 and is buried in Greenwood Cemetery, Wheeling, West Virginia.

Medal of Honor Citation 
For extraordinary heroism on 6 April 1865, in action at Deatonsville (Sailor's Creek), Virginia, for capture of flag of 18th Florida Infantry (Confederate States of America).

References 

1840s births
1894 deaths
Year of birth uncertain
United States Army Medal of Honor recipients
American Civil War recipients of the Medal of Honor